Salsbruket is a village in Nærøysund municipality in Trøndelag county, Norway. The village is located at the end of the Oppløyfjorden, at the mouth of the river Oppløyelva. A sawmill lies in the eastern part of the village, the Oplø area in the center, and Langnes in the western part of the village. Salsbruket Chapel is located in the central part of Oplø.

References

Villages in Trøndelag
Nærøysund
Nærøy